Rani Avantibai Lodhi (died 20 March 1858) was an Indian Rajput queen-ruler and freedom fighter. She was the queen of the Ramgarh (present-day Dindori) in Madhya Pradesh. An opponent of the British East India Company during the Indian Rebellion of 1857, information concerning her is sparse and mostly comes from folklore. In 21st century, she has been used as an icon in Lodhi Rajput politics, she comes from Lodhi Rajput community.

Early life 
Avantibai Lodhi was born in Lodhi Rajput family on 16 August 1831 in Mankehadi village district Seoni. Her father’s name was Jujhar Singh. She was married to Rajput Prince Vikramaditya Singh Lodhi, the son of Raja Laxaman Singh of Ramgarh (present-day Dindori). She had two children Aman Singh and Sher Singh. In 1851 Raja Laxaman Singh died. Raja Vikramditya became King of Ramgarh. As a Queen she efficiently administrated state affairs. 
As the guardian of the minor sons, the state power came to the queen. The queen ordered the farmers of the state not to obey the instructions of the British. This reform work increased the popularity of the queen.

Indian rebellion of 1857 
When the revolt of 1857 broke out, Avantibai raised and led an army of 4000. Her first battle with the British took place in the village of Kheri near Mandla, where she and her army were able to defeat the British forces. However, stung by the defeat the British came back with vengeance and launched an attack on Ramgarh. Avantibai moved to the hills of Devharigarh for safety. The British army set fire to Ramgarh and turned to Devhargarh to attack the queen.

Avantibai resorted to guerilla warfare to fend off the British army. However, when facing almost certain defeat in battle, she committed suicide by piercing herself with a guard's sword on 20 March 1858.

Legacy 
After India's independence, Avantibai has been remembered through performances and folklore. One such folk song is of the Gond people, a forest dweller tribe of the region, which says: 

She is among the viranganas (heroic women) lauded by  groups of people involved in the events of 1857, other examples of whom include Rani Laxmi Bai, Asha Devi, Jhalkari Bai, Mahabiri Devi and Uda Devi.

Although little is known of Avantibai except through folklore, her story merited a brief inclusion in the National Council of Educational Research and Training (NCERT) history textbooks from 2012 as a participant in the 1857 rebellion, after parliamentary protests from the Bharatiya Janata Party and Bahujan Samaj Party (BSP). Although she was a Lodha Rajput queen, The BSP, in particular, had been using the story of Avantibai, along with accounts of other Dalit folk heroines, as a means to promote the image of Mayawati, with her biographer Ajoy Bose commenting that she is cast as their "modern avatar".

The Narmada Valley Development Authority named a part of the Bargi Dam project in Jabalpur in her honour.

India Post has issued two stamps in honour of Avantibai, on 20 March 1988 and on 19 September 2001.

See also 
NCERT textbook controversies

References

Further reading 

Year of birth missing
1858 deaths
19th-century women rulers
History of Madhya Pradesh
Indian rebels
Indian women in war
Military history of British India
Women from Madhya Pradesh
People from British India
Indian queen consorts
Regents of India
Suicides by sharp instrument in India
Women in 19th-century warfare
19th-century Indian women
19th-century Indian people
1850s suicides
Suicides in India